Salatın is a village in the Shusha District of Azerbaijan.  The village was the site of the killing of journalist Salatyn Asgarova, who was covering the First Nagorno-Karabakh War; the village was renamed in her honor.

Populated places in Shusha District